Eriastrum is a genus of flowering plants in the phlox family which are known commonly as woollystars. These wildflowers are somewhat diverse in appearance but are usually erect, thin-stemmed herbs which bear purple to white blooms. Most species have inflorescences which are webbed with a woolly mesh of white fibers. Woollystars are native to western North America.

Species:
Eriastrum abramsii - Abrams' woollystar
Eriastrum brandegeeae - Brandegee's woollystar
Eriastrum densifolium - giant woollystar
Eriastrum diffusum - miniature woollystar
Eriastrum eremicum - desert woollystar
Eriastrum filifolium - lavender woollystar
Eriastrum hooveri - Hoover's woollystar
Eriastrum luteum - yellow woollystar
Eriastrum pluriflorum - Tehachapi woollystar
Eriastrum sapphirinum - sapphire woollystar
Eriastrum sparsiflorum - Great Basin woollystar
Eriastrum virgatum - wand woollystar
Eriastrum wilcoxii - Wilcox's woollystar

References

External links
Jepson Manual Treatment

 
Polemoniaceae genera
Flora of North America